Papaver armeniacum, the Armenian poppy, is a species of flowering plant in the family Papaveraceae, native to the Caucasus region. It produces the benzylisoquinoline alkaloid armepavine (6 7 methoxy 1 (4' hydroxy benzyl) 1234 tetrahydro isoquinoline).

Subtaxa
The following subspecies are accepted:
Papaver armeniacum subsp. armeniacum
Papaver armeniacum subsp. microstigmum (Boiss.) Kadereit
Papaver armeniacum subsp. pilgerianum (Fedde) Kadereit

References

armeniacum
Flora of Turkey
Flora of the Caucasus
Flora of Iraq
Flora of Iran
Plants described in 1821